The men's 3000 metres steeplechase event at the 2003 European Athletics U23 Championships was held in Bydgoszcz, Poland, at Zawisza Stadion on 17 and 19 July.

Medalists

Results

Final
19 July

Heats
17 July
Qualified: first 4 in each heat and 4 best to the Final

Heat 1

Heat 2

Participation
According to an unofficial count, 30 athletes from 21 countries participated in the event.

 (1)
 (1)
 (3)
 (1)
 (1)
 (1)
 (3)
 (3)
 (2)
 (1)
 (1)
 (1)
 (1)
 (1)
 (1)
 (1)
 (3)
 (1)
 (1)
 (1)
 (1)

References

3000 metres steeplechase
Steeplechase at the European Athletics U23 Championships